The 2021 LEN Men's European Junior Water Polo Championships, took place between 12 and 19 September 2021, in Malta. It was the third time that Malta had hosted the event, after previously hosting it in 2007 and 2017.

Qualification
The top 2 teams out of each group qualified for the tournament, along with the top 8 teams from the 2019 championships, leading to 16 qualified teams overall.

Group A
Group A of the qualifying round took place in Korčula, Croatia, between 25 and 27 June 2021.

|  style="text-align:left; width:40%; vertical-align:top;"|

|  style="text-align:left; width:40%; vertical-align:top;"|

|  style="text-align:left; width:20%; vertical-align:top;"|

Group B
Group B of the qualifying round took place in Tbilisi, Georgia, between 17 and 20 June 2021.

|  style="text-align:left; width:40%; vertical-align:top;"|

|  style="text-align:left; width:40%; vertical-align:top;"|

|  style="text-align:left; width:20%; vertical-align:top;"|

Group C
Group C of the qualifying round took place in Maribor, Slovenia, between 24 and 27 June 2021.

|  style="text-align:left; width:40%; vertical-align:top;"|

|  style="text-align:left; width:40%; vertical-align:top;"|

|  style="text-align:left; width:20%; vertical-align:top;"|

Group D
Group D of the qualifying round took place in Prague, Czech Republic, between 24 and 27 June 2021.

|  style="text-align:left; width:40%; vertical-align:top;"|

|  style="text-align:left; width:40%; vertical-align:top;"|

|  style="text-align:left; width:20%; vertical-align:top;"|

Preliminary round
All times are local (UTC+2).

Group A

Group B

Group C

Group D

Knockout stage

Bracket

5th place bracket

9th place bracket

13th place bracket

Play-offs

Quarterfinals

13–16th place semifinals

9–12th place semifinals

5–8th place semifinals

Semifinals

15th place game

13th place game

Eleventh place game

Ninth place game

Seventh place game

Fifth place game

Third place game

Final

Final rankings

Medalists

References

International water polo competitions hosted by Malta
Men's European Junior Water Polo Championship
European Junior Water Polo Championship
LEN